The 2016–17 Israel Youth State Cup (Gvia HaMedina LeNoar) was the 62nd season of Israel's nationwide football cup competition.

The competition was won by Hapoel Ra'anana, who had beaten Hapoel Rishon LeZion 1–0 in the final.

Results

First round
Matches were played between 20 and 25 September 2016, with a single match delayed until 7 December 2016.

Second round
Most matches were played on 3 December 2016, with six matches delayed and completed until 3 January 2017.

Third round
The 16 matches were played between 24 December 2016 and 14 January 2017.

Fourth round
The 16 Premier League clubs joined the competition. Matches were played between 1 and 5 February 2017.

Round of 16
All matches were played on 11 March 2017.

Quarter-finals
Matches were played on 5 April 2017.

Semi-finals

Final

References

External links
 Israel Football Association website 

Israel Youth State Cup
State Youth Cup